Aníbal Ciocca (born 23 July 1915) was a Uruguayan football-player notably active during the 1930s and 1940s, member of the forward line that conquered the Quinquenio de Oro (1939-1943) for Nacional.

He came to Nacional in 1931 from Montevideo Wanderers.

In Nacional he was Uruguayan champion eight times: in 1933, 1934, 1939, 1940, 1941, 1942, 1943 and 1946.

National team
He also played for Uruguay national football team in 21 occasions, in which he scored 7 goals. He was part of the teams that won the Copa América in 1935 and 1942.

Clubs

Honours

National Tournaments

International honours

External links 
 Aníbal Ciocca en NacionalDigital.com

References

1915 births
Uruguayan footballers
Uruguayan Primera División players
Montevideo Wanderers F.C. players
Club Nacional de Football players
Uruguay international footballers
Uruguayan people of Italian descent
Year of death missing
Copa América-winning players
Association football forwards